César Nicolás 'Nico' Varela Bautista (born 19 January 1991) is a Uruguayan footballer who currently plays for AEZ Zakakiou as a right winger.

Club career

Spain
Born in Montevideo, Varela moved to Spain in 2003, and was spotted by Real Murcia scouts while playing for local Ranero CF, aged 15. He made his senior debuts in 2009–10 season with the reserves, being relegated to Tercera División.

On 28 August 2011 Varela debuts as a professional, playing the last 23 minutes in a 1–3 home loss against Celta de Vigo. On 3 September, in his only second appearance with the first team, he was sent off after the end of the 90 minutes, in a 0–1 away loss against Elche CF.

On 17 March 2012, in a 1–3 away loss against Xerez CD, Varela was again sent off, being suspended for four matches. He finished the season with 6 appearances (111 minutes of action).

In July 2012 Varela signed with Cádiz CF, in Segunda División B. However, after only appearing six times with the Andalusians, he was loaned to UCAM Murcia CF in January 2013.

In July, Varela rescinded with Cádiz.

On 1 August 2013 Varela signed with UD Almería B, also in the third level. He was released in May of the following year, after contributing with four goals and 29 matches, his best input in the category.

Zakynthos
On 21 August 2014, Varela joined Football League Greece side Zakynthos F.C. He scored five goals in 22 matches, and left the club at the end of the season.

Botev Plovdiv
Varela joined PFC Botev Plovdiv on 1 July 2015. On 18 July he made an official debut during the 1–1 draw with Levski Sofia.

On 29 August 2015, Varela scored his first goal in A Grupa during the second half of the 2–1 home win over Cherno More Varna. He also scored the winner against PFC Montana and Cherno More.

Varela was released from Botev Plovdiv on 13 January 2016, after contributing with 16 games and three goals.

AEL
On 28 January 2016, Varela signed a -year contract with Greek club AEL. At the end of season, he celebrated the championship as the club promoted to the Super League.

References

External links

1991 births
Living people
Footballers from Montevideo
Uruguayan footballers
Association football wingers
Segunda División players
Segunda División B players
Tercera División players
Real Murcia players
Cádiz CF players
UD Almería B players
Football League (Greece) players
A.P.S. Zakynthos players
Athlitiki Enosi Larissa F.C. players
First Professional Football League (Bulgaria) players
Botev Plovdiv players
Ekstraklasa players
Wisła Płock players
Uruguayan expatriate footballers
Uruguayan expatriate sportspeople in Spain
Expatriate footballers in Spain
Uruguayan expatriate sportspeople in Greece
Expatriate footballers in Greece
Uruguayan expatriate sportspeople in Bulgaria
Expatriate footballers in Bulgaria
Uruguayan expatriate sportspeople in Poland
Expatriate footballers in Poland